Yarmouth and Clare was a federal electoral district in Nova Scotia, Canada, that was represented in the House of Commons of Canada from 1917 to 1925. This riding was created in 1914 from Digby and Yarmouth ridings. It consisted of the County of Yarmouth and the municipality of Clare. It was abolished in 1924 when it was redistributed into Digby and Annapolis and Shelburne—Yarmouth ridings.

Members of Parliament

This riding elected the following Members of Parliament:

Election results

See also 

 List of Canadian federal electoral districts
 Past Canadian electoral districts

External links 
 Riding history for Yarmouth and Clare (1914–1924) from the Library of Parliament

Former federal electoral districts of Nova Scotia